Westminster Choir College (WCC) is a historic conservatory of music currently operating on the campus of Rider University in Lawrenceville, New Jersey. Rider's College of Arts and Sciences, the college under which the historic institution has been reorganized, consists of Westminster Choir College as well as three additional schools.

The Choir College was previously an independent school, located first in Dayton, Ohio (1926–1929), then Ithaca, New York (1929–1932), and for most of its history in Princeton, New Jersey (1932–2020). It merged into Rider University in 1992, and subsequent financial issues led to consolidation onto the Rider University main campus.

WCC educates students at the undergraduate and graduate levels for careers in music education, voice performance, pedagogy, music theory, composition, conducting, and sacred music. Professional training in musical skills with an emphasis on performance is complemented by studies in the liberal arts. The school's proximity to New York City and Philadelphia provides students with easy access to the musical resources of both cities.

History

1920–1932: Presbyterian beginnings to the creation of a college

In 1920 John Finley Williamson founded the Westminster Choir at the Westminster Presbyterian Church of Dayton, Ohio. In 1926, he established the Westminster Choir School. The school started with a faculty of ten, and sixty students. The graduates came to be known as Ministers of Music, a term coined by Williamson and still used today by many church music programs.

In 1922, the choir, then known as the Dayton Westminster Choir, began touring the United States annually, singing in Carnegie Hall (New York City), nearby Cincinnati Music Hall (Cincinnati), Symphony Hall (Boston), the Academy of Music (Philadelphia), Orchestra Hall (Chicago) and the White House for President Calvin Coolidge. The Choir made its first commercial recording with RCA Victor in 1926; recordings with other major conductors and orchestras followed.

In 1928, the Choir and the Cincinnati Symphony Orchestra conducted by Leopold Stokowski made the nation's first coast-to-coast broadcast on Cincinnati radio station WLW. By a few years later, the Choir made a total of 60 half-hour broadcasts from NBC's New York facilities.

On March 9, 1929, the Choir performed at the White House for newly inaugurated President Herbert Hoover. Years later, the Choir also sang for Presidents Franklin D. Roosevelt and Dwight D. Eisenhower.

The first European tour took place in 1929 and was sponsored by Dayton philanthropist Katharine Houk Talbott and endorsed by Walter Damrosch, conductor of the New York Symphony Orchestra. The tour included 26 concerts in major cities of Europe.

Originally a three-year program, the Choir School moved to Ithaca College in New York State in 1929 and enlarged its curriculum to a four-year program culminating in a Bachelor of Music degree. A major reason for the move involved the need to be able to reach the major cities of Chicago, Philadelphia, and New York by rail. All three were cities that sought the choir under Williamson.

1932–1991: Independent music school in Princeton 

In 1932, the choir school relocated to Princeton, New Jersey, which became its long-term home. Classes were held in the First Presbyterian Church and the Princeton Seminary until 1934, when the school moved to its present campus. This was made possible by a large gift from the Ohio philanthropist Sophia Strong Taylor. The dedication of the new campus was marked by a performance of Johann Sebastian Bach's Mass in B minor at the Princeton University Chapel with the Westminster Choir, soloists, and the Philadelphia Orchestra conducted by Leopold Stokowski. The services of the soloists, orchestra, and conductor were a gift from Stokowski.

There was a second European choir tour in 1934 lasting nine weeks and highlighted by a live radio broadcast from Russia to the United States. In the 14 years since its founding in 1920, the choir already had two European tours, which earned it international acclaim and a campus of its own. The State of New Jersey in 1939 granted the choir school accreditation and the name Westminster Choir College was adopted.

In years to come, under Williamson's leadership, the choir would begin having regular concerts with the New York Philharmonic and the Philadelphia Orchestra. The Westminster Choir sang with the New York Philharmonic for the first time in 1939, conducted by Sir John Barbirolli. Since that time, the choir has sung over three hundred performances with the Philharmonic, a record number for a single choir to perform with an orchestra. Later that year, the choir sang with the NBC Symphony Orchestra, conducted by Arturo Toscanini. That same year the choir, directed by Williamson, sang at the dedication of the New York World's Fair, which was broadcast to 53 countries.

In 1957, under the auspices of the U.S. State Department Cultural Exchange Program, the choir undertook a five-month world tour, concertizing in 22 countries, covering  and appearing before approximately a quarter-million people.

Williamson retired as President of Westminster Choir College in 1958. Shortly after his death, in accordance with his request, his ashes were scattered on his beloved campus on July 3, 1964. This was said to have taken place during the performance of the Verdi Requiem with the Westminster Festival Choir, soloists, and the Festival Orchestra conducted by maestro Eugene Ormandy. This performance on the Westminster campus was part of the Tercentennial Celebration of the State of New Jersey. The following day, a memorial service for Williamson was held in the College Chapel.

In 1976, the choir college celebrated its 50th anniversary, highlighted by a performance of Ludwig van Beethoven's Ninth Symphony with the Atlanta Symphony Orchestra conducted by Robert Shaw, alumni soloists, and the Westminster Alumni Choir on the Princeton University campus. Despite a promising future at the 50th anniversary, Westminster soon began to see its prospects for continued existence threatened.  Facilities on the campus fell into disrepair, and Erdman Hall was ultimately condemned as unfit for use.  Recognizing that the college could not continue in this path, Westminster was faced with two options: either find a larger university to merge with, or close.

1991–2017: Merger with Rider University and maintenance of dual campuses 

Several schools, including nearby Princeton University as well as Drew University, Yale University, The Curtis Institute of Music, and The Juilliard School, all had an interest in purchasing Westminster Choir College.  The desire of Westminster to remain in its historic campus resulted in an arrangement with the nearby Rider College.  In 1992, following a year of affiliation,  Rider College merged with Westminster Choir College and the music school became a part of the newly created Rider University. Despite promises that Rider would maintain the Westminster Choir College campus in Princeton, two years later, Rider President J. Barton Luedeke began exploring a move that would relocate WCC to Lawrenceville, New Jersey, to be with the rest of Rider University.  By 1996, the choir college appeared to have a vibrant fiscal future in Princeton, operating in the black, thanks to increased enrollment and donations. One year later Erdman Hall was renovated, restored, and reopened as the Presser Music Center at Erdman Hall, featuring teaching studios, a keyboard laboratory, voice library and resource center, and new classroom space.

Despite the optimistic future in the 1990s, by the early 2000s Rider University determined Westminster Choir College either must create an even stronger fiscal future or face closure. Looking for a way to control costs and more effectively create synergies between the two campuses of Rider University (Westminster's and the main campus), in November 2007, Rider University President Mordechai Rozanski announced the creation of the Westminster College of the Arts.  Westminster College of the Arts was envisioned to integrate Rider and Westminster more successfully, and create a new culture and environment of artistic excellence on both campuses.  Westminster Choir College continued to educate Westminster College of the Arts students in the fields of piano, composition, voice, organ, choral conducting, sacred music, and music education.  The newly formed School of Fine and Performing Arts served as the gateway to receiving a degree in musical theatre, arts administration, and music, as well as a non-professional degree (B.A. in Fine Arts) in music, dance, and theater. The creation of Westminster College of the Arts sparked heated debate among administrators, students, alumni and faculty that highlighted the divide between Rider's Princeton and Lawrenceville campuses.

Westminster formed the Princeton University Program with nearby Princeton University. By reciprocal arrangement, Westminster students, except freshmen, may petition to take courses at Princeton. Generally, no cost is involved beyond tuition charges at Westminster. Students are limited to one course per term, to fall or spring enrollment and to courses not offered by Westminster. The program is limited to 10 students per semester, selection and approval being made by academic deans at both institutions. In return, ten select students of Princeton University study and take courses at Westminster each semester.

In 2005, Westminster unveiled an ambitious master plan calling for upgrades including a new building, the first to be created on the campus under Rider University's stewardship. The choir college also entered a cooperative agreement with the Princeton Regional Schools, allowing for up to 40 Westminster performances per year in their newly created Regional Performing Arts Center (located in Princeton High School across the street), alleviating Westminster's struggle from having no dedicated, large performance space on the campus.

The lack of a large concert venue was solved in 2013 when the State of New Jersey allotted $4.6 million to Rider University to be spent on new academic facilities for Westminster's campus. Combined with donations from alumni and other supporters of the conservatory, the funds spent on this project far exceeded $5 million. Opened in 2014, the complex is named the Marion Buckelew Cullen Center in honor of the philanthropist who died in 2012 and made a $5 million bequest to Westminster Choir College. The new building contains a 3,000-square-foot performance and rehearsal hall named the Hillman Performance Hall, in recognition of the Henry L. Hillman Foundation, which provided a $3 million grant to support the project.  In addition to the performance/rehearsal hall, the Cullen Center includes a large lobby, a green room, and three flexibly configured classrooms that accommodate a wide range of academic and choral uses. The Cullen Center also includes an integrated connection to The Playhouse that provides improved audience access and amenities.  To maximize the opportunities the project offers for enhancing The Playhouse itself, the college secured $1.5 million to upgrade this building that has played such an important role in Westminster's history. Ground was broken for the project in the summer of 2013 and the Cullen Center was completed by spring 2015. Currently, as a result of the college's move to Lawrenceville, the Cullen Center sits abandoned with no plans for future use.

2017–present: Move to Lawrenceville 
On March 28, 2017, after months of speculation following an announcement by Rider that it was again considering moving the Westminster students to the Lawrenceville campus and selling the Princeton campus due to purported financial problems, it was decided by the Board of Trustees that Rider would, instead, attempt to sell WCC to a new affiliate partner. A timeline of 12 months was established with hopes that a buyer would be found in the upcoming year.

Fearing that Westminster could be made to shutter its doors and cease its mission, a large ensemble of students, alumni, faculty, community members, and others gathered at the Lawrenceville campus for a silent protest on the morning of the vote. They sang the school's "alma mater" – "The Lord Bless You and Keep You" by Peter Lutkin – numerous times, hoping to convince the trustees not to silence the college.

On February 26, 2018, Rider announced its intention to sell Westminster to an education and manufacturing firm headquartered in China. This created widespread speculation that it was President Gregory G. Dell'Omo's intention to scuttle the college. This was also reported in a March 2018 Bloomberg Business News article which said that Beijing Kaiwen Education Technology Co. (formerly called Jiangsu Zhongtai Bridge Steel Structure Co.) had agreed to pay $40 million for the college. The sale subsequently faced opposition from state politicians on grounds of national security, and lawsuits from Westminster alumni and donors and the Princeton Theological Seminary alleging, among other things, violation of IRS regulations and of previous agreements governing the Princeton campus.

On July 1, 2019, it was announced that Beijing Kaiwen was withdrawing from the proposed purchase. This was followed by news that Rider would relocate Westminster's programs to the Lawrenceville campus in September 2020. At Rider University's convocation exercises on August 29, 2019, Dell'Omo announced that the relocation of Westminster and the sale of a large portion of Westminster's Princeton campus would directly benefit Rider University's ongoing campus investments.

Westminster Choir College officially relocated to Rider's Lawrenceville campus in fall 2020, operating under remote instruction because of the COVID-19 pandemic. In 2022, the Westminster College of the Arts merged with the Rider University College of Liberal Arts and Sciences to create the College of Arts and Sciences of which Westminster Choir College is a school. As of February 2023, the Princeton campus is being used by Westminster Conservatory (the University's community music school), for outside rentals, and for a small number of Westminster Choir College rehearsals and performances. The status of the campus continues to be held up in two separate lawsuits.

Grammy Awards

James Whitbourn: Annelies, 2014
Westminster Williamson Voices,
James Jordan, Ariana Zukerman, and The Lincoln Trio 
Naxos Records (Nominated)

Dvořák: Requiem; Symphony No.9 From the New World, 2000
The Westminster Symphonic Choir
Zdeněk Mácal and the New Jersey Symphony Orchestra
Delos Records

Berlioz: Romeo & Juliet, 1986
The Westminster Symphonic Choir
Riccardo Muti and the Philadelphia Orchestra
Angel/EMI (Nominated)

Barber: Anthony & Cleopatra, 1983
The Westminster Symphonic Choir
C. Badea and the Spoleto Festival Orchestra
New World Records

Haydn: Lord Nelson Mass, 1977
The Westminster Symphonic Choir
Leonard Bernstein and the New York Philharmonic
Columbia (Nominated)

Symphonic performances
The Westminster Symphonic Choir has performed with many major orchestras and conductors including: New York Philharmonic, Philadelphia Orchestra, National Symphony Orchestra, NBC Symphony Orchestra, Pittsburgh Symphony Orchestra, Boston Symphony Orchestra, Cleveland Orchestra, Atlanta Symphony Orchestra, San Francisco Symphony Orchestra, New Jersey Symphony Orchestra, Chicago Symphony Orchestra, and Los Angeles Philharmonic. The Symphonic Choir, under the direction of Westminster's Director of Choral Activities, has sung at individual performances of large orchestral/choral works with professional orchestras conducted by Claudio Abbado, Daniel Barenboim, Leonard Bernstein, Herbert von Karajan, Eugene Ormandy, William Steinberg, Leopold Stokowski, Charles Dutoit, Neville Marriner, Nicholas McGegan, Arturo Toscanini, and Bruno Walter, and such contemporary figures as Pierre Boulez, Mariss Jansons, Erich Leinsdorf, James Levine, Zdeněk Mácal, Kurt Masur, Lorin Maazel, Michael Tilson Thomas, Riccardo Muti, Claudio Abbado, Seiji Ozawa, Wolfgang Sawallisch, Robert Shaw, Zubin Mehta, Albert Wolff, and Rafael Frühbeck de Burgos. The choir has also received numerous invitations over the years to sing with such touring orchestras as the Berlin Philharmonic, the Berlin State Opera Orchestra, the Dresden Philharmonic Orchestra, the Bavarian Radio Symphony Orchestra, the Korean Broadcasting Symphony Orchestra, the Royal Concertgebouw Orchestra, and the Vienna Philharmonic when these orchestras have come to perform in New York City and Philadelphia. Since the move of WCC in 2020 to Rider University's Lawrenceville campus, WCC has collaborated with the Orchestra of St. Luke's, the Pittsburgh Symphony Orchestra, and the Princeton Symphony.

Notable people

Past and present faculty 
Robert L. Annis, Dean of Westminster Choir College of Rider University, 1992–2014
Dalton Baldwin, Adjunct Professor Emeritus of Piano and Voice, since 1948
Diane Meredith Belcher, Assistant Professor of Organ, 2003–2006
Ken Cowan, Coordinator of Organ and Sacred Music, 2006–2012
Faith Esham, Adjunct Assistant Professor of Voice since 2000
Joseph Flummerfelt, distinguished Professor of Choral Conducting, 1971–2004
Zehava Gal, Adjunct Associate Professor of Voice since 1994 
James Jordan, Professor of Choral Music and Senior Conductor since 1991
Joan Lippincott, Organ Department, 1960–1994
Alexander McCurdy, Organ Department, 1940–1965
Alan Morrison, Associate Professor and Chair of the Organ Department
Sharon Sweet, Associate Professor of Voice since 1999
John Finley Williamson, Founder and influential choral conductor. Deceased.
Marion Zarzeczna, Piano

Alumni 
E. Wayne Abercrombie, conductor and Professor Emeritus at University of Massachusetts Amherst
Adele Addison, African American lyric soprano
Norah Amsellem, operatic soprano and a winner of the Metropolitan Opera National Council Auditions
Amy Anderson, stand-up comedian, actor, and writer
Jennifer Aylmer, operatic soprano noted for performances with the Metropolitan Opera
Pamela Baird, former actress, best known for her role on Leave It to Beaver
Jean Ashworth Bartle, Canadian choral conductor, Founder of the Toronto Children's Chorus
Diane Curry, mezzo-soprano
Scott Dettra, concert organ virtuoso, former organist of Washington National Cathedral
Elsie Hillman, Republican philanthropist
Helen Kemp, world-renowned children's choir clinician, Westminster Professor Emerita of Voice and Church Music.
Jennifer Larmore, internationally renowned mezzo-soprano
Joan Lippincott, concert organ virtuoso, former head of Westminster's Organ Department
James Litton, American choral conductor, American Boychoir
George Lynn, conductor, composer, organist, and music educator
Norman Mackenzie, multiple Grammy Award winning director of the Atlanta Symphony Orchestra Chorus and Chamber Chorus
Warren Martin, composer and conductor of classical music
Dorothy Maynor (Rooks), concert soprano, music educator, founder of the Harlem School of the Arts
Monét X Change (Kevin Bertin), drag artist and singer
Donald Nally, conductor and opera chorus master, Chicago Lyric Opera
Eric Nelson, Director of Choral Studies at Emory University
Yannick Nézet-Séguin, French Canadian conductor, Music Director of the Philadelphia Orchestra
Julia Perry, neoclassical composer and conductor
Rosephanye Powell, singer, musicologist, and composer
Anwar Robinson, finalist on American Idol
Alfredo Silipigni, opera conductor, founder of the New Jersey State Opera
Michael Sylvester, internationally acclaimed tenor
Olav Anton Thommessen, Norwegian composer and professor of composition at the Norwegian Academy of Music

See also
List of university and college schools of music

References

External links
 Westminster Choir College of Rider University
 Talbott Library
 Coalition to Save Westminster Choir College in Princeton

 
1926 establishments in Ohio
Universities and colleges in Mercer County, New Jersey
Music schools in New Jersey
Lawrence Township, Mercer County, New Jersey
Princeton, New Jersey
University choirs
Educational institutions established in 1926
Rider University